Emma Friberg (born 21 December 1992) is a Swedish handball player who plays for EH Aalborg.

References

1992 births
Living people
People from Lund Municipality
Swedish female handball players
Sportspeople from Skåne County
21st-century Swedish women